Ḥantamah bint Hishām was the mother of Umar ibn al-Khattab and wife of Khattab ibn Nufayl. She lived during the 6th century and was a contemporary of the Islamic prophet Muhammad. Her son Umar would become Muslim and is regarded as the second "Rightly guided Caliph" (Arabic "Rashidun") by Muslims (except Shiites). She was the ancestor of many Sahabas.

Ancestry
Hantamah was born in Mecca to Hisham ibn al-Mughirah.

Hisham ibn al-Mughirah was the son of Mughirah ibn Abd-Allah, one of the leaders of the Quraish. One of his daughters was Hantamah, who was the mother of Umar.  By his wife Asma bint Mukharraba, he was the father of Abu Jahl, the famous opponent of Muhammad.

Biography
Hantamah was the daughter of Hisham ibn al-Mughirah. She was born in Mecca. She belong to Banu Makhzum clan of the Quraysh tribe. 

Hantamah married Khattab ibn Nufayl, this marriage was arranged by her father. Hantamah gave birth to her first child Umar around 583 or 584 CE (Umar was born in Mecca to the Banu Adi clan, which was responsible for arbitration among the tribes.) and her daughter Fatimah was born few years after. Her Husband belong to Banu Adi, a clan of Quraysh tribe. She died in early 600s. Her daughter Fatimah married a member of Banu Adi clan.

Family
Hantamah bint Hisham was the relative of many Companions of Muhammad. From her marriage she was the mother of two children.

Children
The children of Hantamah are:

Umar ibn al-Khattab, he was the elder son of Hantamah and Al-Khattab
Fatimah bint al-Khattab, daughter
Zayd ibn al-Khattab, Step-son of Hantamah, he was the son of Al-Khattab and his second wife Asma bint Wahb.
Daughters and sons-in-law
 Sa'id bin Zayd
 Zaynab bint Madhun, she married Umar before 605
 Umm Kulthum bint Jarwal, she married Umar ibn al-Khattab before 616,
 Qurayba bint Abi Umayya, she married Umar before 616.
Grandchildren
 Abdallah ibn Umar, born c.610 in Mecca
 Hafsa bint Umar, was the wife of Muhammad.
 Ubayd Allah ibn Umar
 Zayd ibn Umar
 Asim ibn Umar
 Abdulrahman ibn Sa'id ibn Zayd also known as Zayd Abdulrahman the Elder was the son of her daughter Fatima.

See also
 Zayd ibn Amr
 Walid ibn al-Mughirah

References

 Al-Suyuti. History of the Caliphs.
 
 Albert Hourani, A History of the Arab Peoples, Faber and Faber, 1991.

Umar
6th-century births
People from Mecca
6th-century Arabs